Vibertiola is a genus of assassin bugs in the tribe Rhaphidosomatini.  Species have been recorded from southern Europe and North-West Africa.

Species
BioLib lists the following:
 Vibertiola argentata Bergroth, 1922
 Vibertiola cinerea (Horváth, 1907) – type species
 Vibertiola ribauti Bergroth, 1922

References

External links

Reduviidae
Heteroptera genera